David Rokni ((born January 6, 1932) is an Israeli colonel. He became an Israeli icon as the commander of the annual Israel Independence Day torch lighting ceremony on Mount Herzl in Jerusalem for nearly four decades.

Biography

David Rokni was born in Iran. He was a Colonel in the Israel Defense Forces. For 37 years in a row, Rokni organized and led the annual Independence Day ceremony on Mount Herzl.

In 2013, a documentary film, The Ceremony, about the torch-lighting ceremony and the role of David Rokni, won the Audience Award at the DocAviv Festival.

In May 2016, Rokni announced that he was retiring, and the ceremony that year would be the last one under his command. After the announcement, Rokni was hosted by president Reuven Rivlin at the President's Residence.

See also
Culture of Israel

References

Rokni
1932 births
Living people
Iranian emigrants to Israel